Floris van der Linden (born 10 April 1996) is a Dutch footballer who plays as a forward for SV Spakenburg in the Dutch Tweede Divisie.

Club career
Van der Linden made his professional debut in the Eerste Divisie for SC Telstar on 8 August 2016 in a game against RKC Waalwijk.

References

External links
 

Living people
1996 births
People from Ouder-Amstel
Dutch footballers
Footballers from North Holland
Association football forwards
Eerste Divisie players
Tweede Divisie players
SC Telstar players
Koninklijke HFC players
SV Spakenburg players